Samburu County is a county in the former Rift Valley Province, Kenya. It covers an area of roughly 21,000 km2 (8,000 mi2) in northern Kenya where the Samburu, Turkana and many other tribes live. It stretches north from the Wuaso Ng'iro River to the south of Lake Turkana. According to the 2019 census, the county has a population of 310,327.

Within Samburu County are the towns of Maralal (capital and largest town), Baragoi, Archers Post, South Horr, Wamba, Lodosoit, and Kisima.

It also includes the Samburu National Reserve, Bisanadi National Reserve, and Buffalo Springs National Reserve, Mount Ng'iro, Ndoro Mountains, Mathews Range (Ol Doinyo Lenkiyo), Kirisia Hills, and Loroki Forest.

The main access road to Samburu County is the A4 road from Rumuruti-Maralal-Baragoi, which as of 2019 was being tarmaced from Rumuruti up to Maralal.

There is a town named Samburu in Kwale County also in Kenya, but it is not related to Samburu County or Samburu people.

Population

County subdivisions
The county has three constituencies: Samburu East, Samburu West, and Samburu North. The headquarters of Samburu Central is Maralal, Samburu North is Baragoi and headquarters for Samburu East is Wamba. There has been controversy about the headquarters of Samburu East. Some schools of thought proposed Archers Post, a rapidly growing town, while others proposed Wamba town a less rapidly growing town

Government 
The Samburu County Government is headed by Governor Jonathan Lati Leleliit who won the Samburu county's gubernatorial race in the 2022 general elections under the United Democratic Alliance(UDA). He garnered 40,740 votes against Dr. Richard Lesiyampe of the Jubilee Party who got 26,834 votes, and Daniel Lekupe an independent candidate, who garnered 1,847 votes, coming in third, and last but not least Richard Leiyagu who came last with771 votes. He succeeded the former governor, Moses Lenolkulal, who retired after two terms in office. A member of the national Jubilee party, Lenolkulal was the first governor following Kenya's devolution to county administrations.

References

External links
Office for the Coordination of Humanitarian Affairs – Kenya AdminLevels 1-4 (.pdf)
Kenyan Police Attack Samburu Villages

 
Counties of Kenya